Edwin Lyall Williams (18 June 1906 – 2 October 1994) was a prominent Churches of Christ minister in Victoria and an Australian rules footballer who played with Hawthorn in the Victorian Football League (VFL).

Early life
The son of Arthur James Williams (1864–1935) and Annie Maria Williams, nee Petchell (1864–1928), Edwin Lyall Williams was born at Kaniva on 18 June 1906.

After attending Sandsmere State School and then Nhill Higher Elementary School, Williams moved with his family to Ballarat in the early 1920's.

Football
Williams commenced his football career in Ballarat in 1923 before joining Camberwell in 1928. In 1929 he joined Hawthorn and played there for two years before returning to Camberwell. He played with Camberwell until the end of the 1934 season.

Church
Ordained as a minister with the Church of Christ in 1928, Williams moved from a parish in Boronia to the Glenferrie Church of Christ in 1929. A popular minister, he had the education and gift of expression to speak with depth and subtlety about big issues. In 1936 he accepted a call to the ministry of the Church of Christ at Ponsonby Road in Auckland, New Zealand. He subsequently served as Principal of the Church of Christ national college from 1945 to 1973.

Family
Edwin Lyall Williams married Bertha Lila Brown (1910–1996) on 25 January 1930 and they had two sons and a daughter together.

Williams died at Murrumbeena on 2 October 1994.

Notes

External links 

Lyall Williams's playing statistics from The VFA Project

1906 births
1994 deaths
Australian rules footballers from Victoria (Australia)
Hawthorn Football Club players
Camberwell Football Club players
Ballarat Football Club players
20th-century Australian clergy
Australian expatriates in New Zealand
Academic staff of the University of Divinity